Pieve Fosciana is a comune (municipality) in the Province of Lucca in the Italian region Tuscany, located about  northwest of Florence and about  north of Lucca.

Pieve Fosciana borders the following municipalities: Camporgiano, Castelnuovo di Garfagnana, Castiglione di Garfagnana, Fosciandora, Pievepelago, San Romano in Garfagnana, Villa Collemandina.

References

Cities and towns in Tuscany